M89 or M-89 may refer to:

 Messier 89, an elliptical galaxy in the constellation Virgo
 M-89 (Michigan highway), a state highway in Michigan
 M89SR sniper rifle, a gas operated semi-automatic sniper rifle
 M89-class destroyer, a planned class of French destroyers